Black chicken usually refers to a chicken with solid black plumage.

Black chicken may also refer to:
 Ancona chicken, a breed that originated in Italy
 Ayam Cemani, a breed that originated in Central Java, Indonesia
 Jersey Giant, an American breed created by John and Thomas Black
 Kadaknath, a breed that originated in India
 Silkie, a breed that originated in China
 Svarthöna or Swedish Black Chicken
 White-Crested Black Polish, a type of Polish chicken

See also
 "Black Chicken 37", a song by Buena Vista Social Club from the album Lost and Found
 Crow Black Chicken, an Irish blues-rock band